The Young Man with an Apple is an oil on wood painting by the Italian High Renaissance painter Raphael, executed c. 1505. It is housed in the Uffizi Gallery in Florence. Made during the artist's Florentine period, it is often thought to be the portrait of Francesco Maria I Della Rovere.

See also
List of paintings by Raphael

Notes

References

External links
 

1505 paintings
Paintings by Raphael in the Uffizi
Portraits by Raphael
16th-century portraits